Freeport is an unincorporated community in Hanover Township, Shelby County, in the U.S. state of Indiana.

History
Freeport was platted in 1836. The community was so named for its status as a shipping point. A post office was established at Freeport in 1837, and remained in operation until it was discontinued in 1902.

Geography

References

Unincorporated communities in Shelby County, Indiana
Unincorporated communities in Indiana